János Drapál (3 February 1948 – 11 August 1985) was a Grand Prix motorcycle road racer from Budapest. He had little chance to race in the Grand Prix world championships during the Cold War, but still won four Grand Prix races. Drapál had his best year in 1971 when he won the Yugoslavian Grand Prix and finished the year in seventh place in the 350cc world championship, riding a Yamaha. In 1973 he won two Grand Prix races but slipped to ninth place in the 350cc world championship. Drapál was killed in 1985 after a collision with a Czech track marshal during a 250cc race at the Piešťany airfield circuit in Czechoslovakia.

Grand Prix motorcycle racing results 
Points system from 1950 to 1968:

Points system from 1969 onwards:

(key) (Races in bold indicate pole position; races in italics indicate fastest lap)

References 

1948 births
1985 deaths
Sportspeople from Budapest
Hungarian motorcycle racers
125cc World Championship riders
250cc World Championship riders
350cc World Championship riders
Motorcycle racers who died while racing
Sport deaths in Czechoslovakia